Hernando Bohórquez Sánchez (born 22 June 1992) is a Colombian cyclist, who most recently rode for UCI WorldTeam . He was named in the startlist for the 2017 Vuelta a España.

Major results

2012
 Vuelta a Colombia Under-23
1st Stages 2 & 5
 7th Road race, UCI Under-23 Road World Championships
2013
 3rd Time trial, National Under-23 Road Championships
 5th Road race, Pan American Under-23 Road Championships
2014
 3rd  Road race, Pan American Under-23 Road Championships
 3rd Road race, National Under-23 Road Championships
 7th Road race, UCI Under-23 Road World Championships
2015
 3rd Time trial, National Road Championships
2018
 2nd Overall Tour of Qinghai Lake

Grand Tour general classification results timeline

References

External links

1992 births
Living people
Colombian male cyclists
Sportspeople from Boyacá Department
21st-century Colombian people